This is a list of electricity-generating power stations in the U.S. state of Colorado, sorted by type and name. As of December 2022, Colorado has a total summer capacity of 18,084 MW through all of its power plants, and a year long net generation in 2022 of 58,407 GWh. The corresponding electrical energy generation mix in 2022 was 37.6% coal, 26.7% natural gas, 28.6% wind, 2.9% hydroelectric, 4.2% solar, and 0.3% biomass.

Small-scale solar, including customer-owned photovoltaic panels, delivered an additional net 1,334 GWh to Colorado's electricity grid in 2022.  This compares as about one-half the amount generated by the state's utility-scale photovoltaic plants.  In 2004, Colorado became the first state with a voter-approved renewable portfolio standard (RPS). The RPS requires 30% of electricity sold by investor-owned utilities to come from renewable energy sources by 2020, with 3% from distributed generation.

Wind turbines on Colorado's high eastern plains are productive year-round and continued to proliferate in 2021.  Coal has been undergoing replacement with natural gas and renewables in the state's electricity portfolio.  Half of the coal mined in Colorado was exported in 2019, and extraction of the states's oil and gas reserves increased to record-high levels.

Nuclear power stations
The Fort St. Vrain Nuclear Power Plant generated 330 MW of electricity during years 1976–1989. Decommissioning and removal of the nuclear components was completed in 1992.  The first natural gas combustion turbine was installed in 1995.  Colorado had no utility-scale plants that used fissile material as a fuel in 2022.

Fossil-fuel power stations
Data from the U.S. Energy Information Administration serves as a general reference.

Coal-fired

Natural gas-fired

 Waste heat recovery from gas turbines that are used to compress natural gas.

Petroleum-fired

Renewable power stations
Data from the U.S. Energy Information Administration serves as a general reference.

Biomass

Hydroelectric

Note: This list excludes Colorado's pumped-storage hydroelectric facilities (see Pumped storage).

Wind farms

Solar farms

Storage power stations

Battery storage

Pumped storage

References

 
Colorado
Power stations
Energy in Colorado